Orocrambus ordishi is a moth in the family Crambidae. It was described by David E. Gaskin in 1975. This species is endemic to New Zealand, where it has been recorded from the central and eastern part of the South Island.

The wingspan is 30–34 mm for males and 28–32 mm for females. The forewings are golden brown with a white median streak. The hindwings are shining pale brown. Adults are on wing from late December to April.

References

Crambinae
Moths described in 1975
Endemic fauna of New Zealand
Moths of New Zealand
Endemic moths of New Zealand